Mindreaders is an American game show produced by Goodson-Todman Productions (now part of Fremantle) which aired on NBC from August 13, 1979 through January 11, 1980. Although NBC originally agreed to a 26-week run, the network canceled Mindreaders after 22 weeks. The host was Dick Martin and the announcer was Johnny Olson, with Jack Narz subbing. The program was taped at Studio 4 at NBC in Burbank, California.

Mindreaders was also the final new Goodson-Todman game to be developed under the supervision of co-producer Bill Todman, who died a few weeks before its premiere.

Gameplay
Two teams of four members competed, each consisting of three contestants and a celebrity captain; one team consisted only of men, the other only of women. All questions used on the show were of the yes/no type.

Main game
The host read a question to the three contestants on one team, and each of them locked in an answer. The captain predicted how each of his/her teammates answered, one at a time. Each correct prediction kept the team in control, but a miss allowed the captain of the opposing team to predict the responses given by any remaining members of the controlling team. Each correct response awarded $50 to the team of the captain who gave it, while each miss gave the money to their opponents. Control alternated between teams on each new question. The first team to reach $300 won the game and advanced to the bonus round; both teams kept any money earned in the game.

Bonus round
The bonus round was played in two parts.

Judge the Jury
A "jury" of 10 randomly selected audience members participated in this round. Martin read a question, for which the jury members secretly locked in their answers, and one contestant on the winning team had to predict how many of them had given a specified response. The team won $500 for an exact guess, and $200 for being within two persons either way. Each contestant had one turn in this round; if none of them won any money on their turn, the bonus game ended immediately.

This mini-game of 10 audience members (designed by producer Mimi O'Brien) answering a question was later instituted for the 1986 revival of Card Sharks in 1988.

Celebrity Turnabout
Each of the three contestants separately predicted how their captain answered one last question. If at least two of them guessed correctly, the team's "Judge the Jury" winnings were multiplied by 10, for a potential maximum of $15,000.

Returning champions
Unlike most game shows of that time, Mindreaders did not use the typical "returning champions" carry-over; instead, the same two teams competed against each other for three consecutive games, after which all six contestants retired. Each team's total winnings were divided equally among its three contestants.

Music
The show's theme was composed by Score Productions, and was later used for the unsold Goodson-Todman pilot Puzzlers in 1980 and was also used as a re-arranged version of a commercial cue for Celebrity Charades in 1979. In addition, the win cue from the show was also used for later Goodson-Todman pilots including Puzzlers in 1980, as well as the 1983 pilots for Star Words and Body Language.

Broadcast history
NBC placed Mindreaders in a problematic timeslot, 12:00 Noon (11:00 AM Central), where it faced ABC's The $20,000 Pyramid and CBS' The Young and the Restless as well as low clearances by NBC affiliates in the Eastern Time Zone, who usually ran local newscasts there. Despite NBC's hopes that Martin's legacy from Laugh-In and his guest appearances on Match Game (a show still in syndication at the time and which had a very similar format) would translate into instant audience appeal, the ratings were flat, as were those of the shows preceding it in that time slot since the network moved Jeopardy! from there in January 1974.

Episode status
Unusual for a Goodson-Todman series, especially one in production as late as 1980, most of the Mindreaders archive was destroyed to recycle videotape. NBC was the last major network still recycling some of its videotapes, mostly restricted to game shows by this point, at the time. YouTube has a few of the episodes available.

Buzzr aired the originally unaired pilot episode of the series with Charles Nelson Reilly and Sarah Purcell as the celebrity guests on 25 September 2021 as part of their annual Lost and Found  special block. This episode was noted as being sourced from the UCLA video archives, not those of Fremantle, the current owners of the Goodson-Todman library.

References

External links
 Mindreaders Pilot information

NBC original programming
1970s American game shows
1980s American game shows
1979 American television series debuts
1980 American television series endings
Television series by Mark Goodson-Bill Todman Productions